The Arjuna Award, officially known as the Arjuna Awards for Outstanding Performance in Sports and Games, is the sports honour of Republic of India. It is awarded annually by the Ministry of Youth Affairs and Sports. Before the introduction of the Rajiv Gandhi Khel Ratna in 1991–1992, the Arjuna award was the highest sporting honour of India.

Name
The award is named after Arjuna, a character from the Sanskrit epic Mahabharata of ancient India. He is one of the Pandavas, depicted as a skilled archer winning the hand of Draupadi in marriage and in the Kurukshetra War, Lord Krishna becomes his charioteer teaching him the sacred knowledge of Gita. In Hindu mythology, he has been seen as a symbol of hard work, dedication and concentration.

History
Instituted in 1961 to honour the outstanding sportspersons of the country, the award over the years has undergone a number of expansions, reviews, and rationalizations. The award was expanded to include all the recognised disciplines in 1977, has introduced indigenous games and physically handicapped categories in 1995 and introduced a lifetime contribution category in 1995 leading to creation of a separate Dhyan Chand Award in 2002. The latest revision in 2018 stipulates that the award is given only to the disciplines included in the events like Olympic Games, Paralympic Games, Asian Games, Commonwealth Games, World Championship and World Cup along with Cricket, Indigenous Games, and Parasports. It also recommends giving only fifteen awards in a year, relaxing in case of excellent performance in major multi-sport events, team sports, across gender and giving away of at least one award to physically challenged category.

The nominations for the award are received from all government recognised National Sports Federations, the Indian Olympic Association, the Sports Authority of India (SAI), the Sports Promotion and Control Boards, the state and the union territory governments and the Rajiv Gandhi Khel Ratna, Arjuna, Dhyan Chand and Dronacharya awardees of the previous years. The recipients are selected by a committee constituted by the Ministry and are honoured for their "good performance in the field of sports over a period of four years" at international level and for having shown "qualities of leadership, sportsmanship and a sense of discipline".

Recipients
A total of 151 awards were presented in the 2000s thirty-one in 2000, followed by fourteen in 2001, twenty-one in 2002, fifteen in 2003, fifteen in 2004, fifteen in 2005, fourteen in 2006, eleven in 2007 and fifteen in 2009. Individuals from twenty-six different sports were awarded, which includes nineteen from hockey, eighteen from athletics, thirteen from wrestling, twelve from shooting, nine from badminton, eight each from cricket and kabaddi, seven from chess, six each from boxing and rowing, five from table tennis, four each from archery and billiards & snooker, three each from golf, judo, lawn tennis, swimming, volleyball, weightlifting and yachting, two each from equestrian, football and powerlifting, and one each from basketball, gymnastics and squash.

A major controversy arose in 2001 when Milkha Singh refused to accept the lifetime contribution honour in athletics, being the only sportsperson to date to do so. Milkha Singh, nicknamed The Flying Sikh, was the first Indian athlete to win an individual athletics gold medal at a Commonwealth Games and is best remembered for his fourth-place finish in the 400 metres final at the 1960 Summer Olympics in which he had entered as one of the favourites; his time of 45.73 seconds stood as the Indian national record for almost 40 years. A biographical Bollywood film based on his life, Bhaag Milkha Bhaag, was released in 2013 to critical and commercial success. His reasoning for declining the award included being clubbed with other sportspersons who were not deserving, politicization and lobbying for the award instead of specialists selecting the winners, and the awarding of players who had one good performance in their lifetime in a non-notable competition rather than awarding consistent performers and medalists at the most prestigious international competitions. The "other sportspersons" have been commonly interpreted as Rachna Govil, awarded the lifetime contribution honour of 2000 in athletics, and Kalpana Debnath, awarded the lifetime contribution honour of 2000 in gymnastics. The former was then the deputy director of Sports Authority of India and the latter was then warden of the National Institute of Sports girls hostel in Patiala. Asian discus champion Anil Kumar challenged both the awards in the Delhi High Court, claiming that both awards seemed less on their individual merits and achievements and more on the political influence and lobbying. Due to the stature of Milkha Singh and the attention the controversy garnered, the Sports Ministry revamped the selection system from the year 2002 onwards and introduced a new award for lifetime achievement in sports, the Dhyan Chand Award. Despite him never accepting the award, Singh's name is on the official awardees list.

List of recipients

Explanatory notes

References

External links
 Official Website

 
Indian sports trophies and awards
Lists of Indian award winners